St. Joseph College Seminary was a college of Loyola University Chicago and the college seminary of the Roman Catholic Archdiocese of Chicago.  In January 2019, Cardinal Blase J. Cupich of the Archdiocese announced that the seminary would close in June 2019. The seminary building was sold to Loyola University Chicago and now serves as one of the University's residence halls.

Saint Joseph College Seminary opened as Saint Mary's College in Niles, Illinois in 1964 and became known as the Niles College Seminary.

In 1994, the Niles campus was sold and the seminary moved to Loyola University where the seminary was renamed St. Joseph College Seminary in honor of Cardinal Joseph Bernardin.

In the Archdiocesan Chicago Seminary system, Saint Joseph College Seminary trained college-aged men for the Catholic priesthood.  The Archdiocese of Chicago Seminary System also included the Archbishop Quigley Scholars Program, an outreach program for high school students, and the University of Saint Mary of the Lake incorporating the Cardinal Mundelein Seminary, a major seminary for graduate-level theology studies.

References

External links
Saint Joseph College Seminary
Quigley Scholars Program

Loyola University Chicago
Roman Catholic Archdiocese of Chicago
Catholic seminaries in the United States
Men's universities and colleges in the United States
Catholic universities and colleges in Illinois
1994 establishments in Illinois
Educational institutions established in 1994